Hilary Cane is planetary scientist known for her research on solar energetic particles.

Education and career 
Cane earned her Ph.D. in radio astronomy from the University of Tasmania in 1978. Following her Ph.D., she joined the National Aeronautics and Space Agency's Goddard Space Flight center to work on the International Cometary Explorer. For a period of years, Cane and her husband William Erickson split their time between Maryland and Bruny Island, Tasmania where Cane continued to work at the Goddard Space Flight Center. 

In 2014, Cane was elected a fellow of the American Geophysical Union "for elucidating the relative roles of flares and coronal mass ejections as sources of energetic particles from the Sun."

Research 
Cane's research investigated the abundance of solar energetic particles and the magnetic field of the sun and coronal mass ejections, particles released from the sun that interfere with power grids.

Selected publications

Awards and honors 
 Fellow, American Geophysical Union (2014)

Personal life 
Cane started orienteering in the mid-1970s and has published a walker's guide to Bruny Island. Cane was married to the astronomer William C. Erickson who established the Bruny Island Radio Spectrometer before he died in 2015.

References

External links 
  talk given on June 1, 2017

University of Tasmania alumni
Fellows of the American Geophysical Union
Women physicists
Space scientists
Living people
1949 births